The Campo de Cahuenga, near the historic Cahuenga Pass in present-day Studio City, California, was an adobe ranch house on the Rancho Cahuenga where the Treaty of Cahuenga was signed between Lieutenant Colonel John C. Frémont and General Andrés Pico in 1847, ending hostilities in California between Mexico and the United States. The subsequent Treaty of Guadalupe Hidalgo of 1848, ceding California, parts of Colorado, Nevada, New Mexico, and Arizona (but not Texas since it had seceded from Mexico in 1836, declared itself a republic, and joined the union in 1845) to the United States, formally ended the Mexican–American War. From 1858 to 1861 the Campo de Cahuenga became a Butterfield Stage Station.

History
The original adobe structure was demolished in 1900. The city of Los Angeles provided funds for the purchase of the property in 1923, and a Mission Revival and Spanish Colonial Revival style replica "adobe" ranch house was built by the city following an effort led by Irene T. Lindsay, then President of the San Fernando Valley Historical Society, and dedicated on November 2, 1950. It is now a park and interpretive center managed by the City of Los Angeles's Department of  Recreation and Parks in partnership with the Campo de Cahuenga Historical Memorial Association. Campo de Cahuenga is registered on the National Register of Historic Places, as California Historical Landmark No. 151, and as Los Angeles Historic-Cultural Monument No. 29.

The foundations of the original adobe were unearthed beneath Lankershim Boulevard during construction of the Metro B Line subway. The parts of the foundations within the park are preserved as an exhibit, and the "footprint" of the foundations under the street and sidewalk is marked by decorative pavement.

Campo de Cahuenga is often confused with the nearby Rancho Cahuenga, an inholding within the Rancho Providencia land grant, now part of Burbank.

The building is used by various organizations for special programs and regular meetings, and it is open with a docent on the first Saturday of each month, from 12:00 PM to 4:00 PM.

California Historical Landmark 
California Historical Landmark Marker No. 151 at the site reads:
NO. 151 CAMPO DE CAHUENGA - 'Here was made the Treaty of Cahuenga by General Andrés Pico, commanding forces for Mexico, and Lieutenant-Colonel J. C. Frémont, U.S. Army, for the United States. By this treaty, agreed upon January 13th, 1847, the United States acquired California - finally secured to us by the treaty of Guadalupe Hidalgo, made February 2nd, 1848.' This legend was written February 9, 1898 by Mrs. Jessie Benton Frémont.

See also
 Battle of Cahuenga Pass – 1831
 Battle of Providencia – 1845 Second Battle of Cahuenga Pass
 Conquest of California – 1846 Alta California
  – 1846–1848
 Cahuenga, California; Tongva settlement.
 Tongva—Tongva language
 History of California through 1899
 History of the San Fernando Valley to 1915
 List of Los Angeles Historic-Cultural Monuments in the San Fernando Valley – city
 List of Registered Historic Places in Los Angeles – state
 Category: National Register of Historic Places in the San Fernando Valley – federal

References

 Jorgenson, Lawrence C.: The San Fernando Valley Past and Present, Pacific Rim Research, Los Angeles, 1982

External links

 Los Angeles Department of Parks and Recreation – Campo de Cahuenga
 Campo de Cahuenga at the University of Southern California Archives
 Campo de Cahuenga Historical Memorial Association

Conquest of California
History of the San Fernando Valley
Houses on the National Register of Historic Places in Los Angeles
Parks in Los Angeles County, California
Museums in Los Angeles
Historic house museums in California
California Historical Landmarks
National Register of Historic Places in the San Fernando Valley
Los Angeles Historic-Cultural Monuments
Mission Revival architecture in California
Spanish Colonial Revival architecture in California
Tongva populated places
Studio City, Los Angeles
Butterfield Overland Mail in California
19th century in Los Angeles
1847 establishments in Alta California
Historic districts on the National Register of Historic Places in California
Stagecoach stops in the United States